Nakpadon or Nikpadon is an Israeli heavy armored personnel carrier based on the Centurion-derived Nagmachon.

History
The creation and development of the Nakpadon started during fighting in Lebanon. It was first introduced during the late 1990s, and it has since served in southern Lebanon, the West Bank, and the Gaza region.

Design
Armor: Improvements over the Nagmashot include 3rd generation reactive armor and "EKE" side skirts with rear skirts that can be raised or lowered.

Armament: The Nakpadon carries four FN MAG machine guns and a 40mm grenade launcher.

See also
 Puma armored engineering vehicle
 IDF Achzarit
 Namer

References

External links
 Nakpadon + Sho't Family
 Nakpadon

Armoured personnel carriers of Israel
Military vehicles introduced in the 1990s

he:נגמ"שים כבדים בצה"ל#נקפדון